The Beatitudes are a set of teachings by Jesus.

Beatitudes  may also refer to:
 Les Béatitudes, a French oratorio by César Franck
 The Beatitudes, choral work from Arvo Pärt
 The Beatitudes, chamber music by Vladimir Martynov
 Beatitude, an album by Ric Ocasek
 Mount of Beatitudes, a hill in Northern Israel
 Community of the Beatitudes, a catholic community
 Church of the Beatitudes, a catholic church by the Sea of Galilee